A bashguard is a device used on bicycles to protect components, usually the drivetrain, from damage in the case of a strike with an object, whether intentional or in a crash. There are two types, bashrings and bashplates.

Bashring
In cycling, bashrings are a protective ring, often made of aluminium or polycarbonate, mounted on the outer part of the chainrings on mountain bikes.

They are commonly used on downhill and freeride bikes to protect the chain and chainring in cases of it hitting rocks and other obstacles. The position of the chainring makes it particularly susceptible to rock strikes in this kind of riding.

They are also often used on trials bikes for a similar purpose–to protect the chain and chainring–although they are often used as a tool to get up and over obstacles. It is for this reason that a lot of bashrings aimed at trials riding have a tooth-like profile. They are also used for landing on a log, so are generally wider than those used for downhill and freeride.

Finally, bashrings are used a lot on street bikes, where they are used to protect the chain and chainring when grinding obstacles, and again in the case of a crash.

Bashplate
A bashplate is a device used most often on Mod-class trials bikes, again to protect the chain and chainring. This device, however, is attached to the frame rather than to the crankset. Being more central on the bike (and generally far wider) means that balancing on this is easier, though the fact that it is not attached to the crankarm means it cannot be used to get up obstacles in the same way as a bashring.

Bicycle parts